Hopewell Hall is a settlement in Saint Thomas Parish, Jamaica.

References

Populated places in Saint Thomas Parish, Jamaica